Dabble Bank  is a Site of Special Scientific Interest in the County Durham district of County Durham, England. It lies about 1 km west of the village of Haswell and about 9 km east of the city of Durham.

The site is important for its communities of nationally scarce grassland on Magnesian Limestone and in particular for its unusual location, in a small valley cut into the limestone plateau.

A feature of the site is grassland characterised by downy oat-grass, Avenula pubescens, this being a vegetation type which nationally has a scattered distribution on lowland limestones and which is rare in County Durham. Among the species found is the pyramidal orchid, Anacamptis pyramidalis, which is rare in the county.

References

Sites of Special Scientific Interest in County Durham
Haswell, County Durham